The Group 19 Rugby League (1974-1979) was a rugby league competition, held in the area around Canberra, the broader Australian Capital Territory and Southern New South Wales. The competition merged with Group 8 in 1979 to form the ACTRL and Canberra District Rugby League, which again comnined to form the Canberra Division system in 1982.

The Canberra Rugby League considers the competition part of its history.

Former Clubs

Group 19 Premiers

Group 19 First Grade Premiers

Group 19 Reserve Grade Premiers

Group 19 Under 18s Premiers

References

Rugby league competitions in New South Wales
Sports leagues established in 1974
Sports leagues disestablished in 1979